Earl F. Johnson  (March 30, 1868 – April 8, 1947) was a Michigan politician.

Political life
In 1900, Johnson was a Michigan Alternate delegate to the Republican National Convention.  He was elected as the mayor of City of Flint in 1916 for a single one-year term.

References

Mayors of Flint, Michigan
1868 births
1947 deaths
Michigan Republicans
20th-century American politicians